HN Pegasi is the variable star designation for a young, Sun-like star in the northern constellation of Pegasus. It has an apparent visual magnitude of 5.9, which, according to the Bortle scale, indicates that it is visible to the naked eye from suburban skies. Parallax measurements put the star at a distance of around 59 light years from the Sun, but it is drifting closer with a radial velocity of −16.7 km/s.

It has slightly more mass and a slightly larger radius than the Sun, but a somewhat lower metallicity. It is spinning relatively quickly, with an estimated rotation period of 4.84 days.

The surface magnetic field of the star has a complex and variable geometry. It is a BY Draconis variable star with an active chromosphere, which means there is a rotational modulation of its luminosity due to star spots.  Much like the Sun, the star spot activity undergoes a periodic cycle of maxima and minima lasting roughly  yr.  Its apparent magnitude varies between a maximum of 5.92 and a minimum of 5.95 over a period of 24.9 days.  However, the rotation period is on average 4.84 days.  The star shows an anti-solar pattern of rotation, with the rotation rate steadily increasing during each cycle before dropping back to the initial value upon the start of a new cycle.

In 2007, the discovery of a brown dwarf companion was announced. HN Peg B was spotted using the Spitzer Space Telescope at an angular separation of 43.2 arc sec, showing a methane emission characteristic of T-type dwarfs. The separation corresponds to a projected physical distance of 795 AU, which is uncommonly wide for such brown dwarf companions. The estimated mass of the object is 28 MJ. Based upon its spectrum, HN Peg B has relatively thin cloud decks.

This star displays an emission of infrared excess that suggests there is a circumstellar disk of debris in orbit. HN Pegasi is most likely a thin disk population star. It is a member of the nearby Hercules-Lyra association of stars that share a common motion through space.

References 

G-type main-sequence stars
BY Draconis variables
Solar analogs
Circumstellar disks
T-type stars

Pegasus (constellation)
8314
Durchmusterung objects
0836.7
206860
107350
Pegasi, HN